Virsbo is a locality situated in Surahammar Municipality, Västmanland County, Sweden with 1,517 inhabitants in 2010.

References 

Populated places in Västmanland County
Populated places in Surahammar Municipality